The Canadian Rangers are a 5,000-strong sub-component of the Canadian Armed Forces reserve that provide a limited military presence in Canada's sparsely settled northern, coastal, and isolated areas where it would not be economically or practically viable to have conventional Army units. Formally established on May 23, 1947, a primary role of this part-time force is to conduct surveillance or sovereignty patrols (SOV PATS) as required. 

Some Canadian Rangers also conduct inspections of the North Warning System (NWS) sites and act as guides, scouts, and subject-matter experts in such disciplines as wilderness survival when other forces (such as Army units of the Regular Force or Primary Reserve) are in their area of operations.

About 
The Canadian Rangers are a unit of the Canadian Armed Forces Army Reserve made up of Inuit, First Nations, Métis and other Canadians. There is a misconception that the organization is a First Nations entity. The ethnic make-up of the numerous patrols across Canada is entirely an element of geography and while there is a heavy First Nations membership in many Canadian Ranger patrols (many being entirely First Nations), there also exist many mixed race patrols and some entirely non-aboriginal patrols, simply due to where the patrols reside.

The Canadian Rangers provide a limited military presence in Canada's remote areas and receive 12 days per year of formal training (often more days of training are offered but attendance is not mandatory). They are considered to be somewhat always on duty, observing and reporting as part of their daily lives. Canadian Rangers are paid when formally on duty according to the rank they hold within their patrol and when present on operations or during training events. They are paid in accordance with the standard rates of pay for Class-A (part-time) or Class-B (full-time) Reserve forces, except when they are called out for search and rescue missions or domestic operations (such as fighting floods and wildfires), when they are paid as Class-C Reserves and receive the full Regular Force pay and benefits.

The 5,000 Canadian Rangers are split between five Canadian Ranger patrol groups (CRPGs), commanded by lieutenant-colonels and each allocated to a Canadian division (except 1 CRPG, which is currently allocated to Joint Task Force North). Each CRPG is unique in its make-up, according to its area of responsibility, its geography, and its ethnic make-up. For instance, 3 CRPG, headquartered in Borden, Ontario, has a single province as its area of operations (AO), while 4 CRPG with its headquarters in Victoria, British Columbia, has four provinces. Thus the unit structures between 3 CRPG and 4 CRPG are very different. 3 CRPG has a unit HQ that contains all its full-time staff and has a number of Canadian Ranger patrols throughout the northern region of its province, whereas 4 CRPG has a unit HQ, a number of traditional sub-units ("companies"), and each company has a number of Canadian Ranger patrols. In all cases, it is the job of the Army full-time staff (mostly Class-B Reserve personnel, except for 1 CRPG whose full-time staff are predominantly Regular Force) allocated to the CRPGs to lead and administer the Canadian Ranger patrols in their unit. The patrols themselves are located in various remote, isolated, and/or coastal communities around Canada and each Canadian Ranger patrol is based on such a community. Canadian Ranger patrols are (on average) approximately 30 members strong (the equivalent of a platoon in a conventional Canadian Army unit) and are led by sergeants. The patrols are further divided into the patrol HQ consisting of the patrol commander (sergeant) and the patrol second-in-command (2IC, a master corporal) and 10-member sections, each commanded by a master corporal who is assisted by a corporal.

Pacific Coast Militia Rangers 
Modern Canadian Rangers can trace their heritage back to the Pacific Coast Militia Rangers (PCMR). Formed on March 3, 1942, the Pacific Coast Militia Rangers were volunteers who patrolled, performed military surveillance, and provided local defence of the coastline of British Columbia and in Yukon against the wartime threat of a possible Japanese invasion. At their height, the PCMR consisted of 15,000 volunteers in 138 companies under three major patrol areas, which were Vancouver Island, the lower Fraser Valley and the Bridge River area. Some of the principal officers of the PCMR were Lieutenant-Colonel Cyrus Wesley Peck VC, Lieutenant-Colonel A.L. Coote and Major H. Ashby. The Pacific Coast Militia Rangers were disbanded on September 30, 1945, after Japan's surrender in the Second World War.

Equipment 

Each Canadian Ranger is issued a red Canadian Ranger sweatshirt, CADPAT pants, combat boots, baseball cap, safety vest, rifle and navigation aids. They are expected to be mostly self-reliant regarding equipment. However, they are also provided with a small amount of patrol-level stores (mostly camp stores – tents, stoves, lanterns, axes, etc.). They are reimbursed for the use of personal vehicles and equipment and are paid for this use according to the nationally established equipment usage rates. Items that a Canadian Ranger could be reimbursed for include snowmobiles (called light over-snow vehicles, or LOSVs, in the military), all-terrain vehicles, watercraft, trailers, pack horses, sled dog teams, and a variety of tools and equipment (such as radios, chainsaws, generators, and the like).

Weapons 

Since 1947, the Canadian Rangers have been issued the .303 British calibre Lee–Enfield No 4 rifle, with each user being provided with 200 rounds of ammunition every year.

At the outset of the Second World War, the rest of the Canadian Army was equipping with Enfield rifles, Bren guns, Webley revolvers, and Browning-Inglis Hi Power pistols and Canadian production of these weapons was badly needed for overseas service. The Pacific Coast Militia Rangers thus had to make do with what was readily available, often patrolling with their own rifles and shotguns. This led Canadian purchasing agents to look to American sources for rifles. At the time the most popular style of rifle in the North American West was the .30WCF (.30-30 calibre) lever action. As such, purchasers considered that the Winchester 1894 and Marlin 36 would be easy for the PCMR members to use, as they more than likely had experience with the type already. As a stop-gap until Enfield Rifles became available in numbers for issue, some 3000 Winchesters and an estimated 1800 Marlins were promptly acquired direct from North Haven (likely all these firms had on hand). Guns were issued as needed to senior members of the companies, but stocks of .30-30 ammunition was so limited that only six rounds were issued with the rifle while the rest was locked up in the company's armoury, typically in the vault of the local bank.

The bolt-action Lee–Enfield was then issued to the PCMR as the standard rifle later during the war and it continued to be used by the Canadian Rangers when they were established in 1947. Due to the economy of the .303 (there were thousands left over after the war) and the robust nature of the rifle (especially in conditions such as extreme cold), it was not replaced for use even after being taken out of general service in the remainder of the Canadian military in the 1950s. It has remained in service with the Canadian Rangers for over 70 years and has proven to be most reliable in adverse conditions even in the Canadian Arctic environment.

With the issue of the Colt Canada C19 as their new service rifle in 2015, the Canadian Rangers were officially gifted their retired Lee-Enfields by the Canadian Armed Forces.

Rifle replacement 

Owing to the decreasing availability of spare parts, the replacement of the Lee–Enfield rifle had long been expected, and in August 2011, after user requirements had been determined, the Canadian Forces officially issued a tender request for a bolt-action rifle compatible with 7.62×51mm NATO and .308 Winchester ammunition. Approximately 10,000 rifles were to be bought giving the system a service life of about 30 years. Project management is being provided by the Canadian Army's, Director Land Resources (DLR). The new rifles are a Finnish SAKO design, based on the subsidiary company Tikka's T3 Compact Tactical rifle (CTR). The rifle is being manufactured under licence by Colt Canada and to be in service by 2018. The tender was cancelled in October 2011 due to contractual issues and a new tender was issued in 2014 for replacement rifles with a selection competition in 2015 and the winning design entering service between 2015 and 2019. In April 2015, Colt Canada was selected to produce the rifle under licence. Thirty-three initial examples of the new rifle based on the CTR were delivered to the 4th Canadian Ranger Patrol Group (4 CRPG) in Victoria, British Columbia, in June 2015, while Canadian Ranger instructors from across all CRPGs concurrently attended "train-the-trainer" training at the Small Arms section at the Combat Training Centre, CFB Gagetown, New Brunswick. "Uncontrolled testing" was completed with 100 rifles in Nunavut in August 2015, while controlled testing was conducted in November 2015 in the British Columbia interior, facilitated by 4 CRPG. They are expected to be able to stop all large predators, including polar bears. Feedback from the Canadian Rangers was generally very positive, with only minor adjustments required, and has been incorporated in the final production rifles.

The new rifle features a heavy-taper stainless steel barrel, a detachable 10-round double-stack box magazine, custom iron sights calibrated from 100 to 600 metres, a specially laminated wooden stock with a unique reddish-grey pattern in the wood grain, stainless steel construction with extra corrosion resistant coatings, and enlarged trigger guards and bolt handles so they can be used without removing gloves. The barrel, bolt and receiver will be made by Colt Canada under licence from SAKO. In addition to the rifle, the accessories package will include a custom-moulded Pelican hard transport case (suitable for commercial aircraft transportation), plus a soft transport case for vehicles, such as snowmobiles and ATVs. The rifle will also be outfitted with a custom sling, extra magazines, a trigger lock and custom cleaning kit. The rifle's hard case and soft case, as well as the rifle butt stock feature the Canadian Ranger badge. The Ranger badge on the rifle stock will be engraved and in black relief. The rifle will be designated the C19 rifle. Ammunition for the C19 will be a proprietary .308 Winchester round made in Quebec solely for the C-19 and will consist of the pairing of existing Canadian Forces' match (sniper) brass cases, paired with the Nosler Accubond  bullet. The ammunition designation will be the C-180 round.

Associate Minister of National Defence Julian Fantino announced that the DND planned to buy 6,820 rifles. Including development costs, spare parts, and two million rounds of ammunition, the rifles are expected to cost $28 million.

Chain of command 
The Canadian Rangers became part of the Canadian Army in October 2007, having previously been under the vice chief of the Defence Staff for the Canadian Armed Forces. The Commander of the Canadian Army is the Canadian Ranger National Authority (CRNA), but this role is delegated down to the Army Chief of Staff Reserve (ACOS Res), a brigadier-general. The commander of the Canadian Army has a small cadre of CRNA staff in Ottawa, headed by a Class-A (part-time) lieutenant-colonel and consisting of a full-time major and a small number of captains and master warrant officers. The conduit between the CRNA staff and the ACOS REs is the Director Army Reserve (DARes), a full colonel. These CRNA staff act as a conduit for information, assist with general development and improvement, assist in generating, modifying, and maintaining policy that addresses the unique nature of the Canadian Rangers (including administrative policy, unit establishment and structure, training policy, and logistical policy), and with the financing (overall funding model) of the Canadian Rangers. These staff are not directly within the chain of command and have no authority over the CRPGs, but are instead seen as the technical and advisory link between the Canadian Ranger units and the Commander of the Canadian Army.

Command and control of the respective Canadian Ranger units (known as Canadian Ranger patrol groups or CRPGs) is devolved from the commander of the Canadian Army down to his subordinate commanders of the various regional divisions. There are five CRPGs and each CRPG corresponds to one of the regional divisions (as seen below). The CRPGs tend to be provincially oriented, apart from 1 CRPG, which covers the whole of northern Canada north of the 60th parallel, and 4 CRPG which covers the four western provinces (British Columbia, Alberta, Saskatchewan, and Manitoba). Each CRPG has a headquarters and a number of patrols, albeit that 4 CRPG's patrols are managed within a company construct, with provincially oriented companies each commanding their own patrols. The patrols tend to be centred on remote communities throughout Canada and are frequently named after the town or village they are from (the Terrace Patrol, in British Columbia, for instance).

Patrol areas 
There are five main patrol areas of the Canadian Rangers. Each patrol area is directly controlled by the headquarters unit of a Canadian Ranger patrol group or CRPG.

Junior Canadian Rangers 
The Junior Canadian Rangers (JCR) Programme was created on May 31, 1996, and has more than 3,400 members in 119 locations. Each CRPG is responsible for facilitating the JCRs and receive separate national funding for JCR activity facilitation. Each Canadian Ranger patrol has at least a couple of Canadian Rangers who directly look after the JCRs, and JCR instructors are part of the CRPG's full-time staff. At the national level, the Junior Canadian Ranger programme is maintained by the National Cadet and Junior Canadian Ranger Group, commanded by a brigadier-general. The programme is open to Canadians from ages 12 to 18.

Freedoms 
The Canadian Rangers have received the Freedom of several locations throughout its history; these include:

  22 August 2022: Dawson City.

See also 
 Operation Hurricane (Canada)
 William, Prince of Wales appointed honorary member of the Canadian Rangers on November 10, 2009
 Catherine, Princess of Wales appointed honorary member of the Canadian Rangers on July 5, 2011
 Prince Harry, Duke of Sussex former honorary member of the Canadian Rangers from 10 November 2009 – 31 March 2020.

Similar units of other countries
 Regional Force Surveillance Units, Australia
 51st Battalion, Far North Queensland Regiment
 NORFORCE
 Pilbara Regiment
 Sirius Dog Sled Patrol, Denmark

References

Further reading 
 P. Whitney Lackenbauer, The Canadian Rangers: A Living History. Vancouver: UBC Press, 2013.
 P. Whitney Lackenbauer, editor. Canada's Rangers: Selected Stories, 1942-2012. Kingston: Canadian Defence Academy Press, 2013.
 P. Whitney Lackenbauer, Vigilans: The 1st Canadian Ranger Patrol Group. Foreword by Rt. Hon. Stephen Harper. Yellowknife: 1 Canadian Ranger Patrol Group, 2015.
 P. Whitney Lackenbauer, "The Canadian Rangers: A Postmodern Militia That Works." Canadian Military Journal 6/4 (Winter 2005–06). 49–60.
 P. Whitney Lackenbauer, "Guerrillas in Our Midst: The Pacific Coast Militia Rangers, 1942-45," BC Studies 155 (December 2007). 95–131.
 P. Whitney Lackenbauer, "Teaching Canada's Indigenous Sovereignty Soldiers ... and Vice Versa: 'Lessons Learned' from Ranger Instructors," Canadian Army Journal 10/2 (Summer 2007). 66–81.
 P. Whitney Lackenbauer, "Aboriginal Peoples in the Canadian Rangers: Canada's 'Eyes and Ears' in Northern and Isolated Communities," in Hidden in Plain Sight: Contributions of Aboriginal Peoples to Canadian Identity and Culture, Vol. 2 ed. Cora Voyageur, David Newhouse, and Dan Beavon. Toronto: University of Toronto Press, 2011. 306–328.
 P. Whitney Lackenbauer, "Canada's Northern Defenders: Aboriginal Peoples in the Canadian Rangers, 1947-2005," in Aboriginal Peoples and the Canadian Military: Historical Perspectives edited by P. Whitney Lackenbauer and Craig Mantle. Kingston: CDA Press, 2007. 171–208.

External links 

 
 The Canadian Rangers NWT Historical Timeline, Prince of Wales Northern Heritage Centre

Regiments of Canada
Military units and formations of Northern Canada
Military units and formations established in 1947
Paramilitary organizations based in Canada
Reserve forces of Canada
Military units and formations of Canada in World War II
Army reconnaissance units and formations